Vīrabhadravarman or Śrīndra-Viṣṇukīrti, was a king of Champa from the Simhavarmanid dynasty. He ruled the kingdom from 1441? to  1444. He was a grandson of illustrious King Jaya Simhavarman VI. He was also a nephew of Indravarman VI, and his grandmother was Queen Parameśvarī (top queen), a concubine of Simhavarman VI.  

His older brother was Prince Saṁsāramūrti Vr̥ṣujaya, also called Saṁsāramūrti.

See also
 Maha Vijaya

References

Bibliography
 
 

Kings of Champa
15th-century Vietnamese monarchs